Jupiter Raised by the Nymph Adrasteia or The Childhood of Jupiter is a 17th-century painting by Jacob Jordaens, now in the Gemäldegalerie Alte Meister in Kassel, Germany. It shows the infant Jupiter being raised by the nymph Adrasteia.

Sources
 Gemäldegalerie Alte Meister Schloss Wilhelmshöhe. 2. Auflage. Westermann. Braunschweig 1982, pages 50−51.

 

Paintings by Jacob Jordaens
Paintings of Jupiter (mythology)
Paintings of children
Paintings in the collection of the Gemäldegalerie Alte Meister (Kassel)
Goats in art
Musical instruments in art